On June 5, 1904, thousands of people rioted in St. Louis, Missouri just north of the 1904 World's Fair after a bullfight was canceled by court order. The St. Louis bullfight riot resulted in a handful of injuries and the complete destruction (by fire) of the Norris Amusement Company arena. The riot disrupted the World's Fair for one day, and one bullfighter murdered another shortly after the riot, an action indirectly attributed to the incident.

The riot took place after a promoter named Richard Norris began advertising that he would stage bullfights June 5, 1904, capitalizing on the international spirit engendered by the World's Fair. He built a 16,000 seat arena, naming it after himself, and signed Spanish bullfighter Manuel Cervera Prieto and 35 others to extended contracts. Bullfighting was illegal in the United States and the state of Missouri, and animal rights activists urged Missouri governor Alexander Monroe Dockery to halt the fight. The St. Louis Humane Society pleaded with the governor to "avert this flagrant outrage upon the civilization of the State of Missouri and of the United States." The humane society was joined by religious organizations including the Congregational State Association of Missouri, and under their pressure, Dockery acquiesced. One day before the fight, he ordered the St. Louis County prosecuting attorney to arrest all violators of the state's anti-bullfighting law.

Despite the controversy, Norris sold more than 8,000 tickets at $1 apiece to the bullfight. With the World's Fair closed on Sunday (the day of the fight), Norris hired members of the fair's Wild West show to begin the bullfight with a demonstration of horsemanship. This was followed by a lacrosse demonstration, but the crowd began to become agitated with the wait for the bullfight. Just as the arena's announcer began to introduce Cervera, a deputy sheriff stepped into the arena and told the announcer the fight was not permitted. The deputy and other officers took the organizers to the company's office to settle the matter, but the agitated crowd began throwing rocks through the windows of the office adjacent to the arena after they learned there would be no refunds for the show.

During the fracas, a man standing on the porch of the company office and demanding a refund was struck by a rock and injured. Others inside the office were injured by broken glass. The mob was deterred from storming the building by police with drawn pistols, but there were not enough officers to keep the mob from moving instead to the arena grandstand. Once in the arena, the mob released three emaciated bulls found nearby. The condition of the bulls and their lack of aggression caused many in the crowd to believe the show was a scam and no fight was actually intended. Some in the mob set straw afire in the bullpen, and the flames quickly spread to the grandstand, which was built of highly flammable pine and tar paper.

Despite the efforts of police and firefighters (who responded from the nearby World's Fairgrounds), the arena burned to the ground. Several members of the mob were subsequently arrested for arson. Two days after the riot, Cervera was killed by fellow bullfighter Carleton Bass as the two fought over payments from the aborted fight. The bullfighters subsequently asserted that the Norris management never intended to host the bullfight.

References 

June 1904 events
1904 in Missouri
1904 riots
Riots and civil disorder in Missouri
Louisiana Purchase Exposition
Bullfighting